Ghazanfar Ali (born 2 February 1980) is an Ex captain of Pakistani field hockey team. He competed in the men's tournament at the 2004 Summer Olympics.

In July 2022, he was named as the head coach of the Ghana hockey team for the 2022 Commonwealth Games.

References

External links
 

1978 births
Living people
Pakistani male field hockey players
Olympic field hockey players of Pakistan
Field hockey players at the 2004 Summer Olympics
Commonwealth Games medallists in field hockey
Commonwealth Games bronze medallists for Pakistan
Field hockey players at the 2002 Commonwealth Games
Field hockey players at the 2002 Asian Games
2002 Men's Hockey World Cup players
21st-century Pakistani people
Medallists at the 2002 Commonwealth Games